Candlewick may refer to:
Candle wick, a part of a candle or oil lamp
Candlewick, a style of glassware made by the Imperial Glass Company
Candlewick (fabric), a thick, soft cotton fabric 
Candlewick, an element in financial candlestick charts
Candlewick (ward), a ward in the City of London
Candlewick Press, a Massachusetts publisher
Candlewick (character), a character from the book The Adventures of Pinocchio